Abiquiú is a census-designated place in Rio Arriba County, in northern New Mexico in the southwestern United States, about 53 miles (85 km) north of Santa Fe. As of 2010, the population was 231. Abiquiú's one school, an elementary school, is part of the Española Public Schools.

Abiquiú means "wild choke cherry place" in the Tewa language. It is also called Santo Tomás de Abiquiú and the Pueblo of Santo Tomás de Abiquiú. In the mid-eighteenth century, the Spanish crown provided land grants to Genízaros here and in other places to establish buffer towns to defend the frontier from raiding tribes such as the Comanche.

Abiquiú was one of the homes of American artist Georgia O'Keeffe from 1929 until 1984. The Georgia O'Keeffe Home and Studio is in Abiquiú. The artist also owned property at the nearby Ghost Ranch. Many of her paintings depict scenes near Abiquiú.

Demographics

History
Abiquiú was first settled in 1742 by 24 Tewa Pueblo families led by a Roman Catholic priest, Francisco Delgado. The Tewa returned to New Mexico after a lengthy residence among the Hopi people in what would become Arizona. Their settlement in Abiquiú was part of the strategy by New Mexican colonists to defend its frontiers against marauding indigenous peoples such as the Apache, Comanche, and Navajo. Abiquiú was on the northern border of the Spanish settlements of New Mexico. In 1747, in one of the numerous raids in the area, the Comanche took 23 women and children captive, forcing the temporary abandonment of Abiquiú. The captives probably were sold or traded in the flourishing slave trade between and among the Spanish and the surrounding indigenous nations.

In 1754, to deal with the raids and the faltering settlement, New Mexico governor Tomás Vélez Cachupín gave 34 Genízaro families a land grant in exchange for them taking a prominent role in frontier defense. Abiquiú was the third such Genízaro settlement established in New Mexico, after Belen and Trampas. The Genízaros were original inhabitants from various tribes whose origin was typically as war captives, who were sold by raiding tribes as slaves and servants of the Spanish. Because they had few rights under the casta laws of the Spanish, acceptance of land grants and resettlement on the dangerous frontier of New Mexico was the principal way for Genízaros to become landowners. Abiquiú became the archetypal Genízaro settlement. Many residents still celebrate their Genízaro heritage in the 21st century.

In the late 18th century, peace was established between New Mexico and the Comanche and the Ute. An annual trade fair at Abiquiú drew many indigenous people to the town, especially the Utes, who traded deer skins for horses and tools. Also, settlers purchased or redeemed captive children from the native people. Bands of Utes often camped for the winter near Abiquiú. But in the 1840s, the peace with the Utes broke down and 1,000 of them came to Abiquiú with a list of grievances and demands. Several Utes were killed in this confrontation. Peace with the Utes was restored in 1849 by the U.S. government, which had recently invaded and conquered New Mexico in the Mexican–American War.

In 1894, their right to the land was validated in the United States Court of Private Land Claims. In 1969, additional land, previously designated as National Forest, was returned to the community. Abiquiú is a popular tourist destination, and some Anglo-Americans have settled in the community.

Old Spanish Trail
Abiquiú was the starting point of the pioneering route of the Old Spanish Trail. This first route, the Armijo Route, was led by Antonio Armijo of Santa Fe, with 60 mounted men and a caravan of pack animals carrying blankets and other trade goods to barter for mules in Alta California. Armijo's caravan left Abiquiú on November 7, 1829, and made the journey to San Gabriel Mission in 86 days, arriving on January 31, 1830. He returned by the same route in 56 days, leaving on March 1 and arriving on April 25, 1830. Armijo documented his route daily, unlike travelers on other routes of the Old Spanish Trail. These reports were very brief, listing dates and stopping places with few other details and no distances recorded. He submitted them to the governor, José Antonio Chaves, and the Mexican government published them on June 19, 1830.

Education
It is in Española Public Schools. The comprehensive public high school is Española Valley High School.

In popular culture

The colorful canyons and mountains near Abiquiú have been featured in numerous movies, including Red Dawn (1984), Silverado (1985), Lonesome Dove (1989), City Slickers (1991), The Last Outlaw (1993), Wyatt Earp (1994), The Wild Wild West (1999), All the Pretty Horses (2000), The Missing (2003), 3:10 to Yuma (2007), No Country For Old Men (2007), Indiana Jones and the Kingdom of the Crystal Skull (2008), Cowboys & Aliens (2011) and The Lone Ranger (2013), and in the TV series Earth 2.

"Abiquiu" is the title of an episode of Breaking Bad. During the episode, a flashback shows Jesse Pinkman and Jane Margolis visiting a Georgia O'Keeffe exhibition, presumably the one in Abiquiú.

Nearby points of interest
 Abiquiu Lake
 Dar al-Islam (organization)
 Echo Amphitheater
 Georgia O'Keeffe Home and Studio
 Ghost Ranch, home of the Ruth Hall Museum of Paleontology
 Monastery of Christ in the Desert
 Santa Rosa de Lima, New Mexico, a ghost town

Notable people
 Julian A. Chavez (1808–1879), rancher, landowner and elected official in Los Angeles, California
 José Manuel Gallegos (1815–1875), priest, politician, delegate from New Mexico Territory to the U.S. House of Representatives (1853–56, 1871–73)
 Georgia O'Keeffe, American artist

Notes

References

External links

Census-designated places in Rio Arriba County, New Mexico
Census-designated places in New Mexico
Old Spanish Trail (trade route)